Discradisca is a genus of brachiopods.

References

External links

Brachiopod genera
Discinida